John H. "Jock" Wilson  (1774 in Ayr – 1855 in Folkestone) was a Scottish landscape and marine painter, president of the Society of British Artists in 1827.

Wilson was apprenticed at age thirteen to a decorator named John Norrie in Edinburgh and then received instruction in landscape painting from Alexander Nasmyth. For about two years Wilson lived in Montrose, where he painted landscapes and taught drawing. In 1798 he moved to London, where he painted scenery for Astley's Amphitheatre and one or two other theatres. During  1807–1855 he exhibited  76 paintings at the Royal Academy. In addition he exhibited 144 paintings at the British Institution (BI) during the 1813–1854 period. In 1825 he won a premium of £100 from the BI for his painting titled The Battle of Trafalgar, which was subsequently purchased by Lord Northwick. In 2010 the painting was accepted in lieu of inheritance tax and allocated to East Ayrshire Council which displayed it locally at the Baird Institute in Cumnock. Wilson was one of the founders of the Society of British Artists where he exhibited extensively throughout his working life. He was its president for the year 1827. In 1827 he was also elected an honorary member of the Scottish Academy.

See also
 John James Wilson (1818–1875) (Young Jock), son, also a painter
 William John Wilson (1833–1909), grandson, theatre scene painter and manager.

References

External links
 
 
 

1774 births
1855 deaths
Scottish landscape painters
British marine artists
18th-century Scottish painters
Scottish male painters
19th-century Scottish painters
Members of the Royal Society of British Artists
19th-century Scottish male artists